Charles Robert Rattray (11 May 1911 – 1 October 1995) was an English footballer who scored 16 goals in 150 league games in a nine-year career in the Football League with Blackpool, Watford, Mansfield Town, Port Vale, and Accrington Stanley.

Career
Rattray played for Fleetwood Windsor Villa, before joining Blackpool for a fee of £10. He scored one goal in nine Second Division appearances in the 1929–30 season, as the "Tangerines" won promotion as champions; his goal came in a 6–0 win over Charlton Athletic at Bloomfield Road on 22 March. After avoiding relegation by slender margins in 1930–31 and 1931–32, Blackpool dropped out of the First Division in 1932–33. He then played 19 Third Division South games in an injury-hit spell at Watford, before scoring five goals in 36 Third Division North games for Mansfield Town. He joined Port Vale in May 1937. He scored one goal in 22 Third Division North appearances in the 1937–38 season, but was given a free transfer from The Old Recreation Ground in May 1938. He moved on to Accrington Stanley, scoring one goal in 19 Third Division North games. He played for Mossley as a wartime guest player in the 1939–40 season, scoring two goals in seven appearances before ending his career with hometown club Fleetwood.

Style of play
Rattray was a skilful dribbling winger who was known by the nickname "Jazz" due to his tendency to "jazz around with the ball".

Career statistics
Source:

Honours
Blackpool
Football League Second Division: 1929–30

References
Specific

General
 

People from Fleetwood
English footballers
Association football wingers
Blackpool F.C. players
Watford F.C. players
Mansfield Town F.C. players
Port Vale F.C. players
Accrington Stanley F.C. (1891) players
Mossley A.F.C. players
Fleetwood Town F.C. players
English Football League players
1911 births
1995 deaths